West Indian Girl is an American rock band from Los Angeles, California, United States. The band's name comes from a type of lysergic acid (LSD) that was popular in the early 1960s. The initials are also a reference to Robert James' and Francis Ten's previous band, "WIG".

History
The band released their self-titled debut album in August 2004 on Astralwerks.

West Indian Girl singer and guitarist Robert James and bassist Francis Ten first met in Detroit in the early 1990s. After Ten moved to Los Angeles, the pair continued their collaboration through the mail until James followed westward. Taking their name from a strain of early street LSD, James and Ten signed with EMI's imprint Astralwerks and formed a proper band for live gigs. After the 2004 release of their self-titled debut album, West Indian Girl released a more dance-oriented remix EP in 2006. Parting company with Astralwerks after their two releases failed to ignite much notice, West Indian Girl signed with the indie label Milan Records and announced the release of their second proper album, 4th and Wall, in October 2007.

In August 2007, the band signed a recording and wireless distribution deal with digital media and entertainment company Flycell. The first single, Blue Wave, was released on September 25, 2007. The band released "4th On the Floor Remixes, Vol. 2" on January 6, 2009, on Smash Hit Music Co.

In January 2012, the band stated via their Facebook page that they were still in the studio working on their newest album. The album was projected to be finished by late 2012.

Band members
Current members
 Robert James - guitar, vocals
 Francis Ten - bass
 Nathan Van Hala - piano, keyboards
 Jesper Kristensen - drums
 Eva Zeva - vocals

Past members
 Chris Carter - keyboards 2004–2005
 Mariqueen Maandig - vocals 2004–2009
 Mark Lewis - drums 2004–2009
 Amy White - keyboards, vocals 2007–2010
 Laura Vall - vocals

Discography
West Indian Girl, August 24, 2004, Astralwerks ASW 78431
Remix EP, August 15, 2006, Astralwerks ASW 70470
4th & Wall, October 23, 2007
 4th On The Floor (Remixes, Vol. 2) January 6, 2009
We Believe, July 7, 2009 (B-sides and rarities collection), Origami Records
 Shangri La, April, 2013

References

Alternative rock groups from California
Astralwerks artists
Musical groups from Los Angeles
Musical groups established in 2004
Dream pop musical groups
Neo-psychedelia groups
American space rock musical groups